Dmitry Vladimirovitch Berestov (born June 13, 1980 in Moscow) is a Russian weightlifter who won the gold medal in the 105 kg class at the 2004 Summer Olympics. He is 186 cm/6 ft 1 tall and weighs 105 kg/231 lb.

In July 2006, Berestov failed a drugs test and faced a two-year competition ban. In 2008 the suspension ended and Berestov returned to the 2008 European Weightlifting Championships, where he won the gold medal in the overall.

References 

1980 births
Living people
Russian male weightlifters
Weightlifters at the 2004 Summer Olympics
Olympic weightlifters of Russia
Olympic gold medalists for Russia
Sportspeople from Moscow
Olympic medalists in weightlifting
Doping cases in weightlifting
Medalists at the 2004 Summer Olympics
European Weightlifting Championships medalists